Baumgartl is a German surname. Notable people with the surname include:

Frank Baumgartl (1955–2010), East German steeplechase runner
Monika Baumgartl (born 1942), German photographer and performance artist
Timo Baumgartl (born 1996), German footballer

German-language surnames